The 1957 World Table Tennis Championships were held in Stockholm from March 7 to March 15, 1957.

Medalists

Team

Individual

References

External links
ITTF Museum

 
World Table Tennis Championships
World Table Tennis Championships
World Table Tennis Championships
Table tennis competitions in Sweden
March 1957 sports events in Europe
International sports competitions in Stockholm
1950s in Stockholm